Pablo Iglesias may refer to:

Pablo Iglesias Posse (1850–1925), Spanish socialist and labour leader
Pablo Iglesias Simón (1977–), Spanish theatre director, playwright, researcher, sound designer, and professor
Pablo Iglesias Turrión (1978–), Spanish politician; Secretary-General of Podemos, and Second Deputy Prime Minister of Spain